José Antonio Hoffmann Reyes (8 December 1929 – 29 April 2006) was a Puerto Rican weightlifter. He competed in the men's lightweight event at the 1952 Summer Olympics.

References

External links
 

1929 births
2006 deaths
Puerto Rican male weightlifters
Olympic weightlifters of Puerto Rico
Weightlifters at the 1952 Summer Olympics
Place of birth missing
20th-century Puerto Rican people